Vihiga is a town in Kenya located on the eastern side of the Kakamega Forest.

Geography
The town is along the road between Kisumu and Kakamega, and only five kilometres north of the equator. Vihiga bears the same name as its county, Vihiga County. Vihiga municipality has a population of 118,696 (2009 census).

Vihiga municipality has six wards; two of them (Central Maragoli and Wamuluma) belong to Vihiga Constituency while the remaining four wards (Chavakali, Izawa, Lyaduywa and North Maragoli) are part of the Sabatia Constituency. In the 2002 general elections, all six civic seats were won by the National Rainbow Coalition.

Demographics
Maragoli are the dominant ethnic group in the area and the town is also known  as Maragoli. Tiriki, Idakho and Banyore are other ethnic groups in this locale. As a county, Vihiga has its administrative headquarters in Mbale township, located within the Vihiga municipality. Vihiga is also a name of one of its divisions. Other divisions include Sabatia, Hamisi, Lwanda and Emuhaya. The people living in Vihiga primarily identify themselves as "Maragoli" and speak a language called Maragoli. This language is quite distinct from other Luhya ethnic groups and was the first Luhya language that was used to translate the Bible. The majority of the Maragoli people were primarily converted into the Quaker denomination of Christians, which is practiced to this day.

References

Vihiga County
Populated places in Western Province (Kenya)
County capitals in Kenya